The 2013–14 Asia League Ice Hockey season was the 11th season of Asia League Ice Hockey, which consists of teams from China, Japan, and South Korea. Eight teams participated in the league, and the Nippon Paper Cranes won the championship.

Regular season

Playoffs

External links
 Asia League Ice Hockey

Asia League Ice Hockey
Asia League Ice Hockey seasons
Asia